Massimo Ceccherini (born 23 May 1965) is an Italian actor, film director, comedian and screenwriter.

Biography
Born in Florence, Ceccherini is the son of a plasterer, he seemed destined for the same profession, but his father was attracted to the world of entertainment. Ceccherini made his first television appearance in the program La Corrida and for years pursued a musical career with his friend Alessandro Paci.  He became known to television viewers in the cabaret show Videomusic, Aria Fresca, conducted by a young Carlo Conti.
In the meantime he got his first part in a film, Welcome to Home Gori directed by Alessandro Benvenuti, with whom the following year he would also act in the film The Party's Over.
In 1994, alongside Paolo Villaggio, Ceccherini appeared in Dear Goddamned Friends, directed by Mario Monicelli. Popular success, however, came with the collaboration with his friend Leonardo Pieraccioni, participating in almost all his films.

Filmography

Film

Welcome to Home Gori (1990) - Danilo
The Party's Over (1991) - Kinder
Amami (1993) - Fan di Anna
Bonus malus (1993)
S.P.Q.R.: 2,000 and a Half Years Ago (1994) - Cliente di Prato
Dear Goddamned Friends (1994) - Marlini
The Graduates (1995) - Pino
Albergo Roma (1996)
Return to Home Gori (1996) - Danilo
The Cyclone (1996) - Libero Quarini
Cinque giorni di tempesta (1997)
Fireworks (1997) - Germano Reali
Viola Kisses Everybody (1998) - Max
Lucignolo (1999) - Lucio
Picasso's Face (2000) - Ceccherini
Freewheeling (2000) - Aunt Natalizia
The Prince and the Pirate (2001) - Melchiorre "Gimondi"
My Life with Stars and Stripes (2003) - Lando
Suddenly Paradise (2003) - Passante
La brutta copia (2004) - Fernando Petriccioli / Leandro Fandechi
Tutti all'attacco (2005) - Max Bernabei
I Love You in Every Language in the World (2005) - Padre Massimo
Napoleon and Me (2006) - Cosimo Bartolini
Nemici per la pelle (2006)
2061: An Exceptional Year (2007) - Cosimetto Delli Cecchi
A Beautiful Wife (2007) - Baccano
Un'estate al mare (2008) - Cecco
Cenci in Cina (2009) - Furio
Me and Marilyn (2009) - Massimo
A Natale mi sposo (2010) - Cecco
Una cella in due (2011) - Manolo
Amici miei – Come tutto ebbe inizio (2011) - Alderighi
Wedding in Paris (2011) - Leonardo
Napoletans (2011) - Pino
Finalmente la felicità (2011) - Paziente
Operazione vacanze (2012) - Spino
La mia mamma suona il rock (2013) - Massimo
Regalo a sorpresa (2013) - Marco
Una vita da sogno (2013) - Cekke Lin
Sarebbe stato facile (2013)
Un fantastico via vai (2013) - il padre di Anna
Tale of Tales (2015) - Father Circus Performer
Il professor Cenerentolo (2015) - Tinto
La coppia dei campioni (2016) - Pappone
Ciao Brother (2016) - Taxi driver
Gli infami - Episodi di vita quotidiana (2016)
Smile Factor (2017) - Massimo
Non ci resta che ridere (2019)
Pinocchio (2019) - The Fox
Il sesso degli angeli (2022)
The Hummingbird (2022)

Theatre
Fermi tutti questo è uno spettacolo, Pinocchio (1998)
Quei bravi racazzi (2006–2007)
Pinocchio (2009)

References

Italian male actors
1965 births
Living people
Actors from Florence
Film people from Florence